Pengkalan Kubor is a town in Tumpat District, Kelantan, Malaysia.

Geology
It is a border town on the Malaysia-Thailand border. Across the Golok River is the Thai town of Tak Bai in Narathiwat province, Southern Thailand.

References

External links
Google Maps link showing Pengkalan Kubor (bottom right) and Ban Taba, Tak Bai (left)

Towns in Kelantan
Tumpat District
Malaysia–Thailand border crossings